General der Infanterie Friedrich August Wilhelm von Brause  (10 September 1769 in Zeitz – 23  December 1836 in Frankfurt (Oder)) was a Prussian officer who fought in the Napoleonic Wars.

References

1769 births
1836 deaths
Prussian commanders of the Napoleonic Wars
Generals of Infantry (Prussia)
Military personnel from Saxony-Anhalt
People from Zeitz